State Route 286 (SR 286) is a west-east state highway located in the northwestern part of the U.S. state of Georgia. It starts in the west at Whitfield County and ends in the east at Eton in Murray County.

Route description
SR 286 begins at an intersection with US 76/SR 52 east of Dalton in Whitfield County. The route heads north, then turns east, crossing the Conasauga River into Murray County. It continues nearly due east into downtown Eton where it meets its eastern terminus, an intersection with US 411/SR 2/SR 61.

Major intersections

See also

References

External links

286
Transportation in Whitfield County, Georgia
Transportation in Murray County, Georgia